is a Japanese model who is represented by the talent agency, Asia Promotion. She is known for being a model for Popteen, which gave her the nickname,  because it has an economic effect that her projects such as wearing clothes and accessories. It gained 50 million Yen for the economic effect. She is nicknamed .

In 2012, Masukawa briefly held a singing career and released music under the name Milky Bunny.

Discography

Studio albums

Singles

Filmography

Magazines

Events

TV series

Drama

Films

Advertisements

References

External links
 Official profile 
  

Japanese female models
1985 births
Living people
Models from Saitama Prefecture
21st-century Japanese singers
21st-century Japanese women singers
Japanese women pop singers